Marvin Robert Dee (August 21, 1917 – January 3, 1977) was an American lawyer, businessman, and politician.

Dee was born in Chicago, Illinois. He went to the Chicago public schools and to Crane College. Bee received his bachelor's and law degrees from DePaul University. Dee practiced law in Chicago and was involved in the construction and real estate businesses. Dee served in the United States Coast Guard Reserve. Dee was involved in the Republican Party. In 1973, Dee was appointed to the Illinois House of Representatives succeeding Peter C. Granata who died while still in office. Dee served until 1975. Dee died in Chicago, Illinois.

Notes

1917 births
1977 deaths
Businesspeople from Chicago
Lawyers from Chicago
Politicians from Chicago
Military personnel from Illinois
DePaul University alumni
Malcolm X College alumni
Republican Party members of the Illinois House of Representatives
20th-century American politicians
20th-century American businesspeople
20th-century American lawyers